Charlotte River may refer to:

 Charlotte River (Florida), former name for a presumed waterway in Florida, United States 
 Charlotte River (Grenada), in Saint John Parish, Grenada
 Charlotte River (Michigan), tributary of the St. Marys River in Chippewa County, Michigan, United States 
 Charlotte Creek (New York) (previously Charlotte River), a tributary of the Susquehanna, New York, United States

See also
Shallotte River, in Brunswick County, North Carolina, United States